Mutshatsha Airport  is an airstrip serving the town of Mutshatsha, Lualaba Province, Democratic Republic of the Congo.

See also

Transport in the Democratic Republic of the Congo
List of airports in the Democratic Republic of the Congo

References

External links
 OpenStreetMap- Mutshatsha Airport
 OurAirports - Mutshatsha
 FallingRain - Mutshatsha
 Google Maps - Mutshatsha

Airports in Lualaba Province